Anastrangalia montana is a species of beetle from family Cerambycidae, that could be found on Crete and Cyprus, in Greece, and in Asian countries like Syria and Turkey. The species, just like their other members of the family, have brown coloured pronotum (males), and black (females).

References

Lepturinae
Beetles described in 1863
Beetles of Asia